Vice is a 2018 American biographical comedy-drama film written and directed by Adam McKay. The film stars Christian Bale as Dick Cheney, with Amy Adams, Steve Carell, Sam Rockwell, Tyler Perry, Alison Pill, and Jesse Plemons in supporting roles. The plot follows Cheney in his desire to become the most powerful Vice President in America's history. It is the second theatrical film to depict the presidency of George W. Bush, following Oliver Stone's W.

Vice was released in the United States on December 25, 2018, by Annapurna Pictures. Despite the polarized reception for the film itself, the performances, particularly of Bale and Adams, were given universal praise. The film received numerous awards. It was nominated for a leading six at the 76th Golden Globe Awards, including Best Motion Picture – Musical or Comedy, with Bale winning for Best Actor – Motion Picture Musical or Comedy; and six at the 72nd British Academy Film Awards, in categories including Best Actor (Bale), Best Supporting Actress (Adams) and Best Supporting Actor (Rockwell).

Accolades

Notes

See also
 2018 in film

References

External links 
 

Lists of accolades by film